Black Rose Is an Emblem of Sorrow, Red Rose Is an Emblem of Love is a 1989 Soviet comedy film directed by Sergei Solovyov. The movie intended to capture and epitomize the absurdity of the breakneck changes happening in the country at the time. It was screened in the Un Certain Regard section at the 1990 Cannes Film Festival.

Cast
 Tatyana Drubich as Aleksandra
 Aleksandr Abdulov as Vladimir, Aleksandra's boyfriend
 Mikhail Rozanov as Dmitry Lobanov (Mitya), Aleksandra's neighbor
 Aleksandr Bashirov as Anatoly Feoktistovich (Tolik) Gnilyuga, Mitya's neighbor
 Ilya Ivanov as Nikolai Plevakin (uncle Koka)
 Aleksandr Zbruyev as Ilya, Aleksandra's father
 Lyudmila Savelyeva as Aleksandra's mother
 Mikhail Danilov as Vladimir's father-in-law
 Assam Kuiyatte as African
 Yuri Shumilo as General Brezhnev
 Georgy Saakyan as Stalin
 Boris Grebenshchikov as Captain of "Ship of Freaks"
 Sergei Solovyov as cameo

References

External links
 

1989 films
1980s musical comedy-drama films
1989 comedy films
1989 crime drama films
Mosfilm films
Soviet comedy-drama films
Russian comedy-drama films
1980s Russian-language films
Cultural depictions of Joseph Stalin
Cultural depictions of Leonid Brezhnev
Films directed by Sergei Solovyov
Films scored by Boris Grebenshchikov
Soviet teen films